The Fidicinini (Boulard & Martinelli, 1996) are a tribe of cicadas.  There are at least 20 genera and 250 described species in Fidicinini, found in the Nearctic and Palearctic.

List of genera
These 24 genera belong to the tribe Fidicinini:

 Ariasa Distant, 1905 i c g
 Beameria Davis, 1934 i c g b
 Bergalna Boulard & Martinelli, 1996 i c g
 Cracenpsaltria Sanborn, 2016 c g
 Diceroprocta Stål, 1870 i c g b (scrub cicadas)
 Dorisiana Metcalf, 1952 i c g
 Elassoneura Torres, 1964 i c g
 Fidicina Amyot & Audinet-Serville, 1843 i c g
 Fidicinoides Boulard & Martinelli, 1996 i c g
 Guyalna Boulard & Martinelli, 1996 i c g
 Hemisciera Amyot & Audinet-Serville, 1843 i c g
 Hyantia Stål, 1866 i c g
 Hyantiini Distant, 1905: 304. n. syn i
 Majeorona Distant, 1905 i c g
 Mura Distant, 1905 i c g
 Nosola Stål, 1866 i c g
 Ollanta Distant, 1905 i c g
 Orialella Metcalf, 1952 i c g
 Pacarina Distant, 1905 i c g b
 Pompanonia Boulard, 1982 i c g
 Prasinosoma Torres, 1963 i c g
 Proarna Stål, 1864 i c g
 Quesada Distant, 1905 i c g b
 Tympanoterpes Stål, 1861 i c g

Data sources: i = ITIS, c = Catalogue of Life, g = GBIF, b = Bugguide.net

References

 
Tibiceninae
Hemiptera tribes